Pulse Racer is a Jaleco Xbox racing game released on December 10, 2002, albeit only in North America. It is billed as a futuristic cart-style racing game in a similar vein as Mario Kart taking place in 2024, featuring "high-tech tools" and "sleek vehicles" where racers must use their own life force to beat the competition. It is often regarded as one of the worst Xbox games on the market.

Gameplay
Pulse Racer's main differentiator among racing games is that a racer's life is tied to their vehicle. If the player pushes a driver too hard, the driver will have a heart attack. The driver will pass out for a few seconds until revived by an adrenaline shot to the heart. Holding forward on the left joystick will result in a speed boost, but holding it down for too long will cause the controller to vibrate before the driver suffers cardiac arrest. Other gameplay features include the ability to bring up a shield to protect against collisions and power-ups from other players (but prevents the player from steering), the ability to shoot cables out from either side of the car to assist in turning (using the left or right trigger buttons) and the ability to pick up power-ups such as speed boost, shield, health and more.

Critical reception

Pulse Racer received "generally unfavorable reviews" according to the review aggregation website Metacritic. Additionally, the game made IGN's Best Worst Game Reviews list.

Notes

References

External links
 

2002 video games
Jaleco games
Science fiction racing games
Kart racing video games
Video games developed in Russia
Video games developed in the United States
Xbox games
Xbox-only games
Multiplayer and single-player video games